The enzyme 11-cis-retinyl-palmitate hydrolase (EC 3.1.1.63) catalyzes the reaction

11-cis-retinyl palmitate + H2O  11-cis-retinol + palmitate

This enzyme belongs to the family of hydrolases, specifically those acting on carboxylic ester bonds.  The systematic name is 11-cis-retinyl-palmitate acylhydrolase. Other names in common use include 11-cis-retinol palmitate esterase, and RPH.  This enzyme participates in retinol metabolism.  This enzyme has at least one effector, Bile salt.

References

 
 

EC 3.1.1
Enzymes of unknown structure